Fetsund Station is a railway station located in Fetsund in Fet, Norway on Kongsvinger Line. The station was built as part of the Kongsvinger Line in 1862. The station is served hourly, with extra rush hour departures, by the Oslo Commuter Rail line R14 operated by Vy.

Railway stations in Fet
Railway stations on the Kongsvinger Line
Railway stations opened in 1862
1862 establishments in Norway